Off-gas may refer to:
Outgassing
air pollution
exhaust gas
flue gas
the effluent gas of a chemical reactor